Gegania may refer to:

 Gegania (gens), a patrician family of Ancient Rome
 Gegania (ancient Roman woman), wife of Servius Tullius
 Gegania (priestess), a Vestal Virgin
 Gegania (gastropod), a synonym of Tuba, a genus of sea gastropods of the family Mathildidae
 Gegania (crater), a crater on 4 Vesta, see List of geological features on Vesta